Acacia bulgaensis is a shrub belonging to the genus Acacia and the subgenus Juliflorae that is native to eastern Australia.

Description
It has glabrous, light-brown to reddish-brown coloured branchlets that are vaguely triquetrous. Like most species of Acacia it has phyllodes rather than true leaves. The evergreen phyllodes usually have a narrowly elliptic shape that is often scarcely curved. It blooms between September and March producing yellow flowers.

Distribution
It is endemic to the Hunter Valley region of New South Wales where it is quite common. It is found around Bulga, Milbrodale and Broke and usually found on hilly sandstone or shale country often as a part of open Eucalyptus forest communities. The type specimen was collected near Bulga.

See also
List of Acacia species

References

bulgaensis
Flora of New South Wales
Plants described in 1992